Congo River, Beyond Darkness is a 2005 film by Thierry Michel examining the Congo River in Africa. The film premiered at the 2005 Festival International du Film Francophone de Namur.

Synopsis
The film takes us from the mouth to the source of the second largest river basin in the world, that of the Congo River (the largest is the Amazon). All along its 4371 km, we discover places that have seen the turbulent history of this country, while archives remind us of the mythological figures that created its destiny: explorers such as Livingstone and Stanley, the colonial kings Leopold II and Baudouin and leaders such as Lumumba, Mobutu and Kabila.

References

External links
 

Les Films de la Passerelle
The official site of Congo River

2005 films
2005 documentary films
Belgian documentary films
2000s French-language films
Congo River
2000s English-language films